United States v. Bhagat Singh Thind, 261 U.S. 204 (1923), was a case in which the Supreme Court of the United States decided that Bhagat Singh Thind, an Indian Sikh man who identified himself as an Aryan, was ineligible for naturalized citizenship in the United States. In 1919, Thind filed a petition for naturalization under the Naturalization Act of 1906 which allowed only "free white persons" and "aliens of African nativity and persons of African descent" to become United States citizens by naturalization.

After his petition was granted, government attorneys initiated a proceeding to cancel Thind's naturalization and a trial followed in which the government presented evidence of Thind's political activities as a founding member of the Ghadar Party, an Indian independence movement headquartered in San Francisco. Thind did not challenge the constitutionality of the racial restrictions. Instead, he attempted to be classified as a "free white person" within the meaning of the Naturalization Act based on the fact that Indians and Europeans share common descent from Proto-Indo-Europeans.

Thind was represented by a fellow Indian American, Sakharam Ganesh Pandit, a California attorney. 

The Court unanimously rejected Thind's argument, adding that Thind did not meet a "common sense" definition of white, ruling that Thind could not become a naturalized citizen. The Court concluded that "the term 'Aryan' has to do with linguistic, and not at all with physical characteristics, and it would seem reasonably clear that mere resemblance in language, indicating a common linguistic root buried in remotely ancient soil, is altogether inadequate to prove common racial origin."

Background
Bhagat Singh Thind had come to the United States in 1913 for higher studies after obtaining a bachelor's degree in India. He enlisted in the United States Army, became a Sergeant and served in the First World War. He was discharged honorably with his character designated as "excellent". Thind was granted citizenship in the state of Washington in July 1918 but his citizenship was rescinded in just four days. He received his citizenship for the second time in the state of Oregon in November 1920 after the Bureau of Naturalization was unsuccessful in its efforts to stall it in Oregon court. The case then reached the Supreme Court, where Sakharam Ganesh Pandit, a California attorney and fellow immigrant, represented Thind.

Argument
Thind argued that Indo-Aryan languages are indigenous to the Aryan part of India in the same way that Aryan languages are indigenous to Europe, highlighting the linguistic ties between Indo-Aryan speakers and Europeans, as most European languages including English are similar to Indo-Aryan languages such as Hindi.

Since the Ozawa v. United States court case had just decided that the meaning of white people for the purposes of the Court were people who were members of the Caucasian race, Thind argued that he was a white person by arguing that he was a member of the Caucasian race. Thind argued using "a number of anthropological texts"  that people in Punjab and other Northwestern Indian states belonged to the "Aryan race", and Thind cited scientific authorities such as Johann Friedrich Blumenbach as classifying Aryans as belonging to the Caucasian race. Thind argued that, although some racial mixing did indeed occur between the Indian castes, the caste system had largely succeeded in India at preventing race-mixing. Thind argued that by being a "high-caste, of full Indian blood" he was a "Caucasian" according to the anthropological definitions of his day.

Thind's lawyers argued that Thind had a revulsion to marrying an Indian woman of the "lower races" when they said, "The high-caste Hindu regards the aboriginal Indian Mongoloid in the same manner as the American regards the Negro, speaking from a matrimonial standpoint." Thind's lawyers argued that Thind had a revulsion to marrying a woman of the Mongoloid race. This would characterize Thind as being both white and someone who would be sympathetic to the existing anti-miscegenation laws in the United States.

Verdict
Associate Justice George Sutherland said that authorities on the subject of race were in disagreement over which people were included in the scientific definition of the Caucasian race, so Sutherland instead chose to rely on the common understanding of race rather than the scientific understanding of race. Sutherland found that, while Thind may claim to have "purity of Aryan blood" due to being "born in Village Taragarh Talawa near Jandiala Guru, Amritsar, Punjab", he was not Caucasian in the "common understanding", so he could not be included in the "statutory category as white persons".

The Court reiterated its holding in Ozawa v. United States, explaining that the words "free white person" in the naturalization act were "synonymous with the word 'Caucasian' only as that word is popularly understood," pointing out that the statutory language was to be interpreted as "words of common speech and not of scientific origin, ... written in the common speech, for common understanding, by unscientific men." Justice Sutherland wrote in his summary:

The 1910 Encyclopædia Britannica entry on "Hinduism" that Justice Sutherland cites as his sole source for this history contradicts his conclusion about the Aryans of Thind's birthplace in the Punjab and explicitly refers to the Aryans of India as part of "the white race."

The Court nonetheless also concluded that "the term 'Aryan' has to do with linguistic, and not at all with physical, characteristics, and it would seem reasonably clear that mere resemblance in language, indicating a common linguistic root buried in remotely ancient soil, is altogether inadequate to prove common racial origin."

The Court argued that the exclusion of non-whites was based on the idea of racial difference rather than the idea that one race is superior or inferior to another race. The Court argued that the racial difference between Indians and whites was so great that the "great body of our people" would reject assimilation with Indians.

In conclusion, the Court also noted that "Congress, by the Act of February 5, 1917, 39 Stat. 874, c. 29, § 3, has now excluded from admission into this country all natives of Asia within designated limits of latitude and longitude, including the whole of India," suggesting its intention that natives of India also be excluded from eligibility for naturalized citizenship.

Aftermath
As a result of the U.S. Supreme Court decision finding that no person of Indian origin could become a naturalized American, the first person from the Indian subcontinent to become an American citizen, A. K. Mozumdar, had his citizenship revoked. A decision on his appeal to the Ninth Circuit Court of Appeals upheld that revocation.

Not only were new applicants from India denied the privilege of naturalization, but the new racial classification suggested that the retroactive revocation of naturalization certificates granted to Asian Indians, of which there were many, might be supported by the Court's decision, a point that some courts upheld when United States attorneys petitioned to cancel the naturalization certificates previously granted to many Asian Indians. Up to fifty Indian-Americans had their citizenship revoked between 1923 and 1927 as a consequence of the Thind ruling. Even Thind's own lawyer, Sakharam Ganesh Pandit, was targeted for denaturalization. However, Pandit successfully argued before the Ninth Circuit that revoking his citizenship would do him and his wife unfair harm under the equitable estoppel doctrine. His citizenship was upheld, and the Bureau of Naturalization subsequently cancelled its pending denaturalization cases against Indian-Americans.

Some of the consequences of revoked naturalized status are illustrated by the example of some Asian Indian landowners living in California who found themselves under the jurisdiction of the California Alien Land Law of 1913. Specifically, Attorney General Ulysses S. Webb was very active in revoking Indian land purchases; in a bid to strengthen the Asiatic Exclusion League, he promised to prevent Indians from buying or leasing land. Under intense pressure, and with Immigration Act of 1917 preventing fresh immigration to strengthen the fledgling Indian-American community, many Indians left the United States, leaving only half their original American population, 2,405, by 1940.

Thind petitioned for naturalization a third time in 1935 after the Congress passed the Nye-Lea Act, which made World War I veterans eligible for naturalization regardless of race. Based on his status as a veteran of the United States military during World War I, he was finally granted United States citizenship nearly two decades after he first petitioned for naturalization. 

As public support for Asian Indians grew throughout World War II, and as India's independence came closer to reality, Indians argued for an end to their legislative discrimination. The repeal of Chinese exclusion laws in 1943 and the granting of naturalization privileges to Chinese encouraged Asian Indians to hope for similar gains. Hurdling over many members of Congress and the American Federation of Labor, which vehemently opposed removing legislative measures barricading Indian immigration and naturalization, the Asian Indian community finally succeeded in gaining support among several prominent congressmen, as well as President Franklin D. Roosevelt. The support culminated in the signing into law by President Truman on July 2, 1946, of the Luce–Celler Act. This Act reversed the Thind decision by explicitly extending racial eligibility for naturalization to natives of India, and set a token quota for their immigration at 100 per year.

See also
 List of United States Supreme Court cases, volume 261
 Racial classification of Indian Americans
 Dred Scott v. Sandford
 United States v. Wong Kim Ark

References

External links
 
 
 Bhagat Singh Thind materials in the South Asian American Digital Archive (SAADA)
 https://www.pbs.org/rootsinthesand/i_bhagat2.html
 http://www.lib.berkeley.edu/SSEAL/echoes/chapter10/chapter10.html
 Caucasian but not White: Article on Court Case at GMU

1923 in United States case law
History of civil rights in the United States
Indian-American history
United States Supreme Court cases
United States immigration and naturalization case law
Race and law in the United States
Anti-Indian sentiment in the United States
Sikhism in the United States
History of Portland, Oregon
United States Supreme Court cases of the Taft Court
Deportation from the United States